Oritin is a flavan-3-ol, a type of flavonoid. It is a component of the proteracacinidin tannins of Acacia galpinii and Acacia caffra (Senegalia caffra).

References 

Flavanols
Senegalia